From the Ashes of Nuclear Destruction is a 2013 compilation album by American thrash metal band Toxic Holocaust. The album is compiled of singles and rarities, such as demo versions from studio albums and rare singles from the various split albums they have released.

Track listing

Personnel 
Toxic Holocaust
Joel Grind – vocals, guitar, bass, drums
Phil Zeller – bass, vocals
Nick Bellmore – drums

Additional
Halseycaust – cover art

References 

2013 compilation albums
Toxic Holocaust albums
Thrash metal compilation albums